Alexandra Lesley Phillips (born 26 December 1983) is a British journalist and former politician. She served as a Brexit Party Member of the European Parliament (MEP) for the South East England constituency from 2019 to 2020. She was the second candidate on the party's list for the constituency after party leader Nigel Farage. Phillips was previously head of media at the UK Independence Party (UKIP), which she left in September 2016. She presented her own show on GB News before its cancellation in September 2022. In February 2023, she joined Reform UK.

Early life and career
Alexandra Lesley Phillips was born on 26 December 1983 in Gloucester. She has an older brother. Her early education was at the grammar schools Denmark Road High School, and Sir Thomas Rich's School in Gloucester. She studied English literature and philosophy at St. Mary's College, Durham University, and broadcast journalism at Cardiff University.

Phillips made a film about the UK Independence Party (UKIP) as a student journalist while covering the 2007 National Assembly for Wales election. She reported that this experience was an important factor in her later joining the party as she was enthralled by then leader Nigel Farage's personality, and supported the party's positions on the expansion of grammar schools, supporting fracking, and Euroscepticism. Prior to joining UKIP, Phillips had worked as a local journalist for ITV, and later BBC Wales.

Political career
Phillips worked as UKIP's head of media for three years. Soon after the 2016 United Kingdom European Union membership referendum in which she voted for Brexit, she left UKIP, at around the same time as Farage, and in September joined the Conservatives, a few weeks after Theresa May had been elected as leader. She stayed on as a media advisor to Nathan Gill, a UKIP MEP and Welsh Assembly member who had become an independent in the Assembly after being beaten by Neil Hamilton for the position of group leader there. She explained her reasons for joining the Conservative Party as her admiration for then Prime Minister Theresa May's positions on Brexit, grammar schools, fracking, and the infighting within UKIP.

In May 2019, Phillips was announced as the Brexit Party's candidate for the South East England constituency in the European parliamentary election. A Green Party candidate also called Alexandra Phillips ran in the same constituency. Both were elected in the election. On 30 May 2019, less than a week after the election, Phillips appeared on the panel of the BBC's weekly Question Time. In July of the same year, Phillips admitted to working for SCL Group, the parent company of Cambridge Analytica, on Kenyan President Uhuru Kenyatta's successful 2017 re-election campaign. She had previously denied working for Cambridge Analytica, but said the work she did was sub-contracted out by SCL.  Cambridge Analytica was a British political consulting firm that closed in 2018 after being found to have harvested millions of Facebook users' data without their consent for political advertising. In the European Parliament, Phillips was a member of the Committee on Development, and was part of the delegation for relations with South Africa.

On 2 August 2019, Phillips was selected as the Brexit Party's prospective parliamentary candidate (PPC) for Southampton Itchen. However, on 11 November 2019, the Brexit Party announced that it would not stand in incumbent Conservative seats. The following day, Phillips announced that she would not be voting in the general election as she had been "disenfranchised" by her party. Her term as MEP ended in January 2020 when the UK withdrew from the EU. In February 2023, she joined Reform UK as a policy adviser to party leader Richard Tice.

Broadcasting career
Phillips presented a twice-weekly show on talkRADIO and is a contributor to The Daily Telegraph. In early 2021, it was announced she would co-host an afternoon programme on GB News, later announced to be alongside former BBC News journalist Simon McCoy. After McCoy moved to the breakfast show, she was given her own show, The Afternoon Agenda, in August 2021. She left GB News in September 2022 after her show was cancelled.

References

External links
European Parliament biography

1983 births
Living people
People from Gloucester
Mass media people from Southampton
21st-century British journalists
Brexit Party MEPs
UK Independence Party people
MEPs for England 2019–2020
21st-century women MEPs for England
Alumni of Cardiff University
GB News newsreaders and journalists
Alumni of St Mary's College, Durham
Politicians from Southampton